Pseuduvaria froggattii is a rare species of tropical rainforest tree in the family Annonaceae. It is endemic north-eastern Queensland, Australia.

Description
Pseuduvaria froggattii is a small rainforest tree reaching  in height. They are glabrous (hairless) on their upper and lower surfaces and have 8-16 pairs of secondary veins emanating from the rachis, or midrib.

Inflorescences occur in clusters of 5-30 and are organized on indistinct peduncles. The sepals are hairless on their upper surface, and densely hairy on their lower surface and margins. Its 6 petals are arranged in two rows of 3. 

The inner petals are white to pink with red highlights near their edges. The inner petals have pointed tips and bases. The upper surfaces of the inner petals are hairless except near their tips. The lower surfaces of the inner petals are sparsely hairy. The inner petals have a pair of prominent, dark purple, smooth, elliptical glands on their upper surface. Each carpel has 2 ovules. Female flowers also have up to 7 sterile stamen. 

Reproductive biology

The pollen of P. froggattii is shed as permanent tetrads. Its flowers are pollinated by flies, including Drosophilidae and dung flies.

Taxonomy
The species was first formally described in 1887 by the German botanist Ferdinand von Mueller in the Australasian Journal of Pharmacy who gave it the name Mitrephora froggattii. In 1986 the Australian botanist L.W. Jessup published a new combination for it in Austrobaileya, i.e. Pseuduvaria froggattii.

Etymology
The genus name Pseuduvaria is derived from a combination of the Ancient Greek ψευδής, (pseudes), meaning "false", and the name of the related genus Uvaria. The species epithet froggattii was given by Mueller to honour Walter Wilson Froggatt who helped collect the specimen he examined.

Distribution and habitat

This species is restricted to a small part of the Wet Tropics of Queensland World Heritage Area, from Melissa Creek near Cape Tribulation in the north, to the Mowbray River near Port Douglas in the south. It has been observed growing in a variety of soil types including loose mixtures, moist substrates, loams and rocky soils in mature rainforests at elevations of 5-60 meters.

Ecology
Pseuduvaria froggattii is the host species for the larvae of the green-spotted triangle and pale green triangle butterflies. The fruits are eaten by cassowaries.

Uses
Oils extracted from its leaves contain high levels of caryophyllene and spathulenol.

References

External links
 
 
 View a map of recorded sightings of Pseuduvaria froggattii at the Australasian Virtual Herbarium
 See images of Pseuduvaria froggattii on Flickriver

froggattii
Flora of Queensland
Endemic flora of Australia
Plants described in 1887
Taxa named by Ferdinand von Mueller